Johann Peter Fritz was a piano maker based in Vienna. He was one of Vienna's most distinguished piano makers. His pianos were valued for good quality and melodiousness. It is known, that Giuseppe Verdi was very fond of Johann Fritz's pianos and used the Viennese 6-pedal Fritz piano from the time of Rigoletto in 1851 to Aida in 1871. This exact piano can be seen in the composer's Villa Verdi in Province of Piacenza in Italy.

After Johann Fritz's death, his son Joseph (born in Vienna, 1808), continued the firm, apparently under the original name. He seemed to have moved his workshop to Graz in the late 1830s, after 1837.

Some of Johann Fritz's instruments survived until today and are presented in museums such as The Museum of Musical Instruments in Milan, The Museum of Fine Arts in Boston, and the Finchcocks Museum in Tunbridge Wells, Kent.

Fritz died in 1834 in Vienna.

Recordings made with original Fritz pianos

 Anneke Scott, Steven Devine. Ludwig van Beethoven. Beyond Beethoven: Works for natural horn and fortepiano. Label: Resonus

References

External links 

 Johann Fritz Fortepiano
 FF - f4 after Fritz, ca. 1812
 Salviamo Villa Verdi. Lanciata una campagna di raccolta fondi online
 Sant’Agata Villanova sull’Arda

Piano makers
1834 deaths
Year of birth missing
Businesspeople from Vienna